Choi Gyu-jin or Choi Kyu-jin may refer to:

 Choi Gyu-jin (wrestler) (born 1985), South Korean wrestler
 Choi Kyu-jin (actor) (born 1996), South Korean actor